Thomas Erby Kilby Sr. (July 9, 1865 – October 22, 1943) was an American politician. He was the eighth lieutenant governor of Alabama and the 36th governor of Alabama.

Biography
Kilby was born in Lebanon, Tennessee, and was educated in public schools. In 1887, he was an agent for the Georgia-Pacific Railroad in Anniston, Alabama. He became a successful businessman in the industrial and banking business.

Career
He was a Democratic politician and served as mayor of Anniston, Alabama from 1905 to 1909. He served as Alabama State Senator from 1911 to 1915.

Kilby served as Lieutenant Governor of Alabama from 1915 to 1919 and as Governor of Alabama from 1919 to 1923 In September 1919 two Black men Miles Phifer and Robert Crosky were arrested over allegations they assaulted two white women in separate incidents in Montgomery, Alabama. A mob quickly formed, and a concerned citizen notified Governor Thomas Kilby that there might be a lynching. Kilby ordered the two to be transferred to the relative safety of prison in Wetumpka, Alabama. Nevertheless, they were intercepted and lynched by a White mob on September 29, 1919.

In 1920, Kilby arbitrated the settlement of the lengthy and violent 1920 Alabama coal strike, ruling clearly against the demands of the United Mine Workers of America. The Child Welfare Department was created in 1919 during Kilby's governorship.

Family life
Kilby married Mary Elizabeth Clark on June 5, 1894. They had three children.

Kilby House, their home in Anniston, Alabama, was built for Kilby while he was Lieutenant Governor. It is listed on the National Register of Historic Places.

Death and legacy 
Kilby died on October 22, 1943, in Anniston, Alabama at 78. He is buried at Highland Cemetery in Anniston.

In 1921, he was depicted on the Alabama Centennial half dollar, making him the first person ever to appear on a US coin while still alive.

The old Kilby Prison and the current Kilby Correctional Facility are named for Thomas Kilby.

See also

List of governors of Alabama
List of lieutenant governors of Alabama

References

External links
 Biography courtesy of the Alabama Department of Archives
 
 Encyclopedia of Alabama

1865 births
1943 deaths
People from Lebanon, Tennessee
Alabama state senators
Governors of Alabama
Lieutenant Governors of Alabama
Politicians from Anniston, Alabama
Mayors of places in Alabama
American Episcopalians
Democratic Party governors of Alabama